Schinia crenilinea, the creniline flower moth, is a moth of the family Noctuidae. It is found in Arkansas, Oklahoma and Texas.

The wingspan is about 24 mm. Adults are on wing in late spring and summer.

External links
Images
Butterflies and Moths of North America
Bug Guide

Schinia
Moths of North America
Moths described in 1891